Amandip Singh Hayer (Punjabi: ਅਮਨਦੀਪ ਸਿੰਘ ਹਾਈਯਰ, born 5 November 1979) better known as Aman Hayer, is a UK-based Bhangra Punjabi music director and singer.

Aman Hayer is a Punjabi Bhangra artist. He is known for his albums Reminisce & Groundshaker I & II.

Born in 1978 in Leamington Spa, he started his music career in the early 2000s, working on a number of artists albums including Amar Arshi's 'Dark Angel', Amar Group's 'Desi in Ya Face', and Saabs' 'First Contact'.

Career
Hayer has produced seven albums of his own, Deja Vu (2002), Reminisce (2003), Groundshaker (2005), Groundshaker II (2008), Nachdi De EP (2009), Ajj Nachna EP (2011) and The Entourage (2011), and has launched careers of Kulwinder Dhillon, Angrej Ali and Nirmal Sidhu and Benny Dhaliwal. Aman Hayer now has his own DJ Roadshow called 'The Entourage Roadshow' where he takes many singers from his camp to perform such as Angrej Ali, Sherry Maan, Mangi Mahal, Benny Dhaliwal, Sarbjit Cheema, K S Makhan, Geeta Zaildar, Dev Dhillon, Gippy Grewal & Rasshee Rraga. Currently Aman Hayer Plays the Dhol, Dholki, Tabla, Keyboard and Harmonium.

Singles

Discography (Albums & Features on Albums)

Unofficial albums composed

Awards 

In 2006, he won Best Producer at the UK Asian Music Awards.

References

External links
Official website   Facebook   Twitter  Instagram

Bhangra (music) musicians
Living people
Punjabi people
People from Leamington Spa
Desi musicians
English Sikhs
Indian male musicians
1979 births